Thorganby is a village and civil parish in the West Lindsey district of Lincolnshire. England. The population is included in the civil parish of Swinhope.

The parish church is a Grade II listed building dedicated to All Saints. Built using ironstone, limestone and red brick, It dates from the 13th century although it was almost completely rebuilt in 1900. It retains its 13th-century font.

Thorganby Hall is a Grade II listed small country house, built of limestone and red brick in 1648 with early 19th-century additions. It was built to replace an earlier Hall which was the seat of the Willoughby family, plundered by the Roundheads during the English Civil War in 1643.

Thorganby C of E School was built in 1868 as a National School. It closed in March 1959.

References

External links

Villages in Lincolnshire
Civil parishes in Lincolnshire
West Lindsey District